Annuar Kock (born 3 December 1991) is an Aruban footballer who plays as a midfielder for SV Estrella and the Aruba national football team.

Career

International
Kock made his senior international debut on 12 July 2011, coming on as a 66th-minute substitute for Theric Ruiz in a 5-4 penalty defeat to Saint Lucia during World Cup qualifying. He scored his first international goal nearly three years later, in a 2-2 friendly draw with Guam.

Career statistics

International

International Goals
Scores and results list Aruba's goal tally first.

References

External links

1991 births
Living people
SV Estrella players
Aruba international footballers
Aruban footballers
Association football midfielders
People from Santa Cruz, Aruba